Kentucky jam cake is a traditional dessert originating in the United States state of Kentucky and also associated with Tennessee. The cake has jam and spices mixed in the batter and is decorated with caramel icing.

See also
 List of regional dishes of the United States

References

Kentucky cuisine
American cakes
Foods with jam
Layer cakes